Deh Abbas or Deh-e Abbas may refer to:

Deh-e Abbas, Kerman
Deh Abbas, Kermanshah
Deh Abbas, Salas-e Babajani, Kermanshah Province
Deh-e Abbas, Sonqor, Kermanshah Province
Deh Abbas, Tehran
Deh Abbas Rural District, Tehran Province